John Floyd may refer to:

 John Floyd (died 1588), English Protestant martyred with William Pikes
 John Floyd (American football) (born 1956), American football wide receiver
 John Floyd (basketball), American College basketball coach, mostly at Texas A&M
 John Floyd (Georgia politician) (1769–1839), United States Representative from Georgia
 John Floyd (Jesuit) (1572–1649), English Jesuit preacher
 John Floyd (pioneer) (1750–1783), American settler in Kentucky
 John Floyd (rugby league) (born 1950), Australian rugby league footballer
 John Floyd (Virginia politician) (1783–1837), Governor of Virginia and United States Representative from Virginia
 John Ashton Floyd, English sculptor
 John B. Floyd (1806–1863), Governor of Virginia, United States Secretary of War, and Confederate general
 John B. Floyd (West Virginia politician) (1854–1935), West Virginia politician
 John C. Floyd (1858–1930), United States Representative from Arkansas
 John E. Floyd (born 1937), Canadian economist
 John G. Floyd (1806–1881), United States Representative from New York
 Sir John Floyd, 1st Baronet (1748–1818), British soldier

See also 
 J. Floyd King (1842–1915), United States Representative from Alabama
 Johnny Floyd (1891–1965), American football and basketball player and coach